The Szabolcs-Szatmár-Bereg County Assembly is the local legislative body of Szabolcs-Szatmár-Bereg County in the Northern Great Plain, in Hungary.

Composition

2019–2024 period
The Assembly elected at the 2019 local government elections, is made up of 25 counselors,  with the following party composition:

After the elections in 2019 the Assembly controlled by the Fidesz–KDNP party alliance which has 18 councillors, versus 8 Jobbik-Hungarian Socialist Party (MSZP)-Momentum Movement-Everybody's Hungary Movement (MMM) and 3 Democratic Coalition (DK) councillors.

2014–2019 period
The Assembly elected at the 2014 local government elections, is made up of 25 counselors, with the following party composition:

After the elections in 2014 the Assembly controlled by the Fidesz–KDNP party alliance which has 15 councillors, versus 5 Jobbik, 5 Hungarian Socialist Party (MSZP) and 1 Democratic Coalition (DK) and councillors.

2010–2014 period
The Assembly elected at the 2010 local government elections, is made up of 26 counselors, with the following party composition:

After the elections in 2010 the Assembly controlled by the Fidesz–KDNP party alliance which has 15 councillors, versus 5 Jobbik, 4 Hungarian Socialist Party (MSZP) and 2 Hungarian Socialist Party (MSZP)councillors.

Presidents of the Assembly
So far, the presidents of the Szabolcs-Szatmár-Bereg County Assembly have been:

 1990–1998 József Medgyesi
 1994–1998 József Zilahi, County Election Coalition (FKgP-KDNP-VP-MDF)
 1999–2002 László Helmeczy, Fidesz-MDF-MKDSZ, and Independent after 2000
 2002–2006 László Gazda, Hungarian Socialist Party (MSZP)
 2006–2008 István Fülöp, Fidesz–KDNP
 since 2008 Oszkár Seszták, Fidesz–KDNP

References

Local government in Hungary

Szabolcs-Szatmár-Bereg County